Madhurima Patni Bhowmick, also known as Gitto, was one of the first student-faculty members, along with Aditi Ranjan and others, in the department of Textile Design at National Institute of Design, Ahmedabad. She guided several students during her tenure as a faculty member, and is responsible for several craft and textile related projects and publications. She is a practicing designer, based in Jaipur.

Work 

Gitto was a faculty member at National Institute of Design, who along with Helena Perheentupa and others was responsible for structuring the 6-week craft documentation exercise for students. After the 2001 earthquake in Gujarat, while working with Gurjari, Gitto gave a set of designs to the artisans in Kutch that eventually became a part of the repertoire for contemporary Ajrakh artisans.

See also 

 Jyotindra Jain
 Aditi Ranjan

References 

Indian women designers
Designers at National Institute of Design
Academic staff of National Institute of Design
Living people
Year of birth missing (living people)